Piotr Petrovich Belousov (May 3, 1912 – March 31, 1989) was a Ukrainian and Russian graphic artist, painter, art teacher, professor of the Ilya Repin Leningrad Institute of Painting, Sculpture and Architecture, People's Artist of the USSR, corresponding member of the Academy of Arts of the USSR, who lived and worked in Leningrad. He was regarded as one of the brightest representatives of the Leningrad school of painting, being most famous for his portraits and historical paintings.

Biography 
Piotr Petrovich Belousov was born May 3, 1912 in the port city Berdiansk, located on the northern coast of the Sea of Azov, of south-east Ukraine, Russian Empire.

In 1929, Piotr Belousov met with Brodsky and by his invitation comes to Leningrad to continue his study. He engaged in drawing and painting under Brodsky leadership, as well as in the studio AKhRs and the Community of Artists.

In 1933, Piotr Belousov entered the first course of the painting department of the Leningrad Institute of Painting, Sculpture and Architecture. He studied under Mikhail Bernshtein, Pavel Naumov, Alexander Lubimov, and Vladimir Serov.

In 1939, Piotr Belousov graduated from the Repin Institute of Arts in Isaak Brodsky workshop together with Aleksei Gritsai, Lev Orekhov, Mikhail Kozell, Gleb Verner, Elena Skuin, Nikolai Timkov, Boris Sherbakov, and other young artists. His graduation work was the historical painting of "On the eve of [the] October Revolution (Meeting of Lenin and Stalin)".

Since 1930, Belousov had participated in Art Exhibitions. He painted genre and historical paintings, portraits, landscapes, worked in easel painting and drawings. Most famous for his portraits and historical paintings devoted to the image of Lenin, the history of Bolshevism and the October Revolution in Russia. His personal exhibitions were in the city of Vologda in 1959, and in Moscow in 1982.

Since 1940, Piotr Belousov had been a member of the Leningrad Union of Artists. In 1939–1989, Belousov taught painting and drawing in the Repin Institute of Arts. He was Professor and Head of Department of Drawing since 1956. In 1970, he was awarded the honorary titles of the Honored Artist of the RSFSR, in 1978 - the Honorary titles of the People's Artist of the Russian Federation (1978). Also, Belousov was elected as the Corresponding Member of the Academy of Arts of the USSR (1979).

Piotr Petrovich Belousov died in Leningrad in 1989. Paintings by Piotr Belousov reside in State Russian Museum, State Tretyakov Gallery, in Art Museums and private collections in Russia, Ukraine, England, France, the U.S., and throughout the world.

See also
 Leningrad School of Painting
 List of Russian artists
 List of 20th-century Russian painters
 List of painters of Saint Petersburg Union of Artists
 Saint Petersburg Union of Artists

References

Bibliography 
 S. Ivensky. Piotr Petrovich Belousov. – Leningrad: Khudozhnik RSFSR, 1959. – 40 p.
 Artists of the USSR. Biography Dictionary. Volume 1. – Moscow: Iskusstvo Edition, 1970. – p. 346.
 Russian Paintings. 1989 Winter Show. – London: Roy Miles Gallery, 1989. – p. 5,16–17.
 Charmes Russes. Auction Catalogue. – Paris: Drouot Richelieu, 15 Mai 1991. – p. 38.
 L' Ecole de Saint-Petersburg. Catalogue. – Paris: Drouot Richelieu, 25 Janvier 1993.
 Matthew C. Bown. Dictionary of 20th Century Russian and Soviet Painters 1900-1980s. – London: Izomar 1998. , .
 Vern G. Swanson. Soviet Impressionism. – Woodbridge, England: Antique Collectors' Club, 2001. – p. 87,216,274. , .
 Sergei V. Ivanov. Unknown Socialist Realism. The Leningrad School. – Saint Petersburg: NP-Print Edition, 2007. – p. 9, 13, 15, 19, 26, 28, 357–359, 363–365, 369, 382, 384, 386, 388–393, 396, 399–401, 403–405, 407, 411, 413–415, 419–424, 445. , .

1912 births
1989 deaths
People from Berdiansk
People from Berdyansky Uyezd
Soviet painters
Socialist realist artists
Leningrad School artists
Members of the Leningrad Union of Artists
Repin Institute of Arts alumni
People's Artists of the RSFSR (visual arts)
Honored Artists of the Russian Federation